Castrillón is a Spanish surname. Notable people with the surname include:
 Álvaro Mejía Castrillón (born 1967), Colombian road bicycle racer
 Jaime Castrillón (born 1983), Colombian footballer
 Manuel Fernández Castrillón (–1836), major general in the Mexican army
 Eduardo Crespo y García-Castrillón, 8th Count of Castillo Fiel (fl. 1963–1989), Spanish aristocrat
 Darío Castrillón Hoyos (1929–2018), Colombian Cardinal of the Catholic Church

Spanish-language surnames